Steely Dan: The Definitive Collection is a compilation album by Steely Dan, released in 2006. It is the first compilation that draws from all of their albums and covers their entire career.

Track listing
All songs written and composed by Walter Becker and Donald Fagen.

Charts
 The album debuted on the Billboard 200 chart on August 19, 2006.

References

2006 greatest hits albums
Steely Dan compilation albums